Stuart J. Knickerbocker (March 10, 1925 – December 14, 2019) was an American animator and cartoonist. He worked for the Jam Handy Organization in Detroit, Portafilms in Drayton Plains, and the Bill Sandy Corporation in Troy.

References

1925 births
2019 deaths
People from Flint, Michigan
Michigan State University alumni
American animators
American cartoonists